Richmond River Shire was a local government area in the Northern Rivers region of New South Wales, Australia.

It was established on 1 January 1976 after the amalgamation Tomki Shire and Woodburn Shire.

Richmond River Shire amalgamated with the Municipality of Casino to establish the Richmond Valley Council on 21 February 2000.

References

Former local government areas of New South Wales
1976 establishments in Australia
2000 disestablishments in Australia